This is a list of dissenting academies in England and Wales, operating in the 19th century. Over this period the religious disabilities of English Dissenters were lifted within the educational system, and the rationale for the existence of a system of general education parallel to that requiring Church of England beliefs therefore fell away. This provision of general education for Dissenters was one of two functions of the academies, the other being the training of ministers (Presbyterian, Congregationalist, Baptist, Methodist and Unitarian). As the century progressed, there were the administrative changes and migrations seen in the 18th century, but also a gradual merging of some of the stronger dissenting academies into the developing university system. Colleges that were in effect nonconformist seminaries could also become theological institutions within universities. By the end of the century the remaining independent "dissenting" system in practical terms had become a network of nonconformist theological colleges.

See List of dissenting academies (1660–1800) for the earlier history. See also List of English and Welsh endowed schools (19th century) for the parallel system of grammar schools.

List

References

19th century
History of education in England
United Kingdom religion-related lists
United Kingdom education-related lists
Lists of schools in England
Lists of schools in Wales